The Pioneer Library System (PLS) is a public library system that serves residents in the central Oklahoma counties of Cleveland, Pottawatomie and McClain with administrative offices in Norman. Additionally, the system also allows those served by the Metropolitan Library System (Oklahoma County) to check out materials via a reciprocal borrowing agreement, and also allows non-residents to borrow materials if they pay an annual fee. The twelve-branch system is governed by a board of trustees. Lisa Wells currently serves as executive director.

The cities of Moore, Norman and Shawnee are served by Redbox-style automated DVD kiosks. Norman is also home to three "24 Hour Libraries" which are automated kiosks. The location at the Irving Recreation Center in Norman is the first such machine in North America to allow customers 24-hour access to library materials. Customers are able to retrieve "holds" from the kiosks or browse available books for checkout.

Locations
Information about the system's administrative offices and branch libraries is shown below. For maps showing all locations, see the "External links" section.

See also
Metropolitan Library System (Oklahoma) – Covers Oklahoma County

References

External links 

Libraries in Oklahoma
Education in Oklahoma County, Oklahoma